Tomasz Neugebauer (born 8 May 2003) is a Polish professional footballer who plays as a defensive midfielder for Podbeskidzie Bielsko-Biała, on loan from Lechia Gdańsk.

Career

Early years

Neugebauer started his career playing in the youth sides of his local team Odra Centrum Wodzisław Śląski. After more than a decade with Odra, Neugebauer joined the youth sides of Ruch Chorzów. With Ruch, Neugebauer progressed to the first team in 2020, making his debut in the III liga on 8 August against Foto-Higiena Gać. Over an 18-month period Neugebauer went on to make 44 appearances and score one goal for Ruch.

Lechia Gdańsk

In December 2021, it was announced that Neugebauer would be joining Ekstraklasa side Lechia Gdańsk on a deal until 2025.

Loan to Podbeskidzie
On 6 December 2022, I liga side Podbeskidzie Bielsko-Biała announced the acquisition of Neugebauer on loan until the end of the season.

References

2003 births
People from Wodzisław Śląski
Living people
Polish footballers
Association football midfielders
Poland youth international footballers
Ruch Chorzów players
Lechia Gdańsk players
Lechia Gdańsk II players
Podbeskidzie Bielsko-Biała players
Ekstraklasa players
II liga players
III liga players
IV liga players